Yo-kai Watch: Enma Daiō to Itsutsu no Monogatari da Nyan! is a 2015 Japanese animated fantasy adventure film directed by  and . It is the second film in the Yo-kai Watch film series, following the 2014 film Yo-kai Watch: The Movie. It was released on December 19, 2015. It was followed by Yo-kai Watch: Soratobu Kujira to Double no Sekai no Daibōken da Nyan!, which released on December 17, 2016.

Plot
Nate, Whisper, Jibanyan, Hailey, USApyon, and all of their Yo-kai friends embark on five unique adventures that all end up tied together in the end.
 On his way to school, Nate unexpectedly and mysteriously falls into a manhole, dies, and becomes the Yo-kai Fuu 2, so he becomes friends with a kid, who's the opposite of him, has trouble with his grades at school, and wishes to become a comic artist.
 Jibanyan, Shogunyan, and Robonyan F-Type are flung 8 years into the future, where Jibanyan helps Amy (his former owner before becoming a Yo-kai) at her new job.
 Komasan and Komajiro return home and discover that their mother has had a third child named Komasaburō, But much to their shock, Komasaburō is a human baby.
 USApyon is chosen to be Santa Claus this year by the Yo-kai Committee, so he and Hailey go throughout town to hand out gifts, but they come across a boy who does not want one, and instead, he wants his mom cured at the hospital.
Whisper, Jibanyan, USApyon, Komasan, and Hovernyan go to the Yo-kai World to fight King Enma, who has suddenly declared that humans and Yo-kai should never be friends. But is it really King Enma or the head of the Yo-kai council Nurarihyon? As the journey of Whisper, Jibanyan, USApyon, Hovernyan and Komasan in Yo-kai World continues,  they discovered that Nurarihyon has sealed King Enma making the citizens of the Yo-kai World believe that King Enma got his disease in the human world, and now with Nate and Hailey joining the team, they must defeat the power hungry Chairman Nurarihyon and his servants to save the King, and Nate and Hailey will use the new Yo-kai Medal the mysterious boy gave him in the first episode, which turned out to be...The Yo-kai Medal of King Enma!!

Cast
Tomokazu Seki as Whisper
Etsuko Kozakura as Jibanyan and Shogunyan
Aoi Yūki as 
Kotori Shigemoto as Usapyon (ＵＳＡピョン, USApyon)
Aya Endō as Komasan and Komajiro
Yūki Kaji as 
Ryōhei Kimura as Lord Enma (エンマ大王, Enma Daiō)
Takehito Koyasu as Zazel (ぬらりひょん, Nurarihyon)
Hanamaru Hakata as Aristokat (猫きよ, Nekokiyo)
Daikichi Hakata as Duke Doggy (犬まろ, Inumaro)
Yuka Terasaki as Yuto Arima
Hiroyuki Yoshino as Dethmetal
Naoki Bandō as Robonyan F
Masami Nagasawa as Amy
Tetsuya Takeda as Giant Santa

Box office 
Enma Daiō to Itsutsu no Monogatari da Nyan! notably finished ahead of Star Wars: The Force Awakens on its opening weekend in terms of admissions, with 975,000 in its first two days. The Force Awakens grossed higher due to more expensive tickets, but only reached 800,000 tickets sold between December 19 and 20. The film was number-one in admissions again on its second weekend, with 450,000, and grossed ., making it the fourth highest-grossing domestic film of 2016.

Overseas, the film grossed $7,967,212 in South Korea, France, and Spain, $47,502 in the United Arab Emirates, and $5,732 in Thailand.

Other Releases 
The film was localized into French on Summer 2019 as well as Latin American Spanish and Brazilian Portuguese on December 7, 2019.

Notes

References

External links
 

2010s fantasy adventure films
2010s Japanese films
2015 anime films
OLM, Inc. animated films
Animated adventure films
Anime films based on video games
Adventure anime and manga
Japanese fantasy adventure films
Japanese animated fantasy films
Toho animated films
Yo-kai Watch films